The University of CEMA is a private university in Buenos Aires, Argentina. It was founded by Carlos Rodríguez, along with Roque Fernández and Pedro Pou, as the Center for Macroeconomic Studies of Argentina (CEMA) University Institute in 1995, a pioneer in higher education programs in the areas of economics, politics, management, and finance in Argentina.

First founded as a research center to contribute to the economic development of the country, the university now offers twelve undergraduate courses, sixteen graduate-level programs, and a wide range of executive education programs. At present, UCEMA has more than 262 faculty members with terminal academic degrees in their fields of study, 6068 alumni, and 1179 students. The comprehensive set of actions carried out by the University includes a wide range of fields; within a framework of humanistic and liberal education. It provides technical and scientific assistance to governments, the academic community, and the business world.

History

Founding 

The beginnings of the UCEMA date back to 1978, the year in which the Center for Macroeconomic Studies of Argentina (CEMA) began its activity. The CEMA, as a research and teaching center, had the purpose of contributing to the dissemination of knowledge (especially diverse and modern economic theories). By 1980, the center started the first program called Master in Economy, and the Master in Business Administration in 1987. In the 1990s, the Master in Finance, Master in Bank Management, and Master in Agribusiness joined the center.
Over the years, the teaching activities progressively extended to other professional fields, and in 1995, the study center was transformed into a university institute. It incorporated the previous experience in research and teaching, with the same objective of contributing to the development that the study center had from its beginnings. In 1996, the Bachelor of Economics and Bachelor of Business Administration degree courses were created. From the year 2000, the University began to dictate the Doctorate in Economics, continuing later with the Doctorate in Business Administration and the Doctorate in Finance. In 2003, after gaining a foothold in the fields of economics, business, and social sciences, the Department of Engineering was created and the Computer Engineering degree began to be taught. The International Relations and Marketing degrees were added to the academic offer as of 2009, and the Bachelor of Human Resources as of 2015. The newest programs are Human Resources in 2015, and Digital Business, Analytic Business, and Finance, which were added in 2020.

Links with the University of Chicago 

In the late 1950s, there was a concern in the Argentine academic world regarding the participation in the development of economic theories that were taking place in various academic centers of international prestige. A preliminary idea was conceived in Chile, in 1955, through the creation of a joint economics program between the University of Chicago and the Catholic University of Chile. That program stimulated that, between the end of 1961 and the beginning of 1962, a similar program was negotiated in Argentina. Arnold Harberger, representing the University of Chicago, introduced in Argentina the novelty of a direct academic link between the two universities, achieving a significant impact in the academic world.

An area of ​​influence that was of significant relevance in the creation of CEMA was the training of some notable students of that time. Pedro Pou, who after studying at the National University of Cuyo was awarded a scholarship and completed his studies in Chicago, began with the interviews to add economists to the project. Finally, after talking with Larry Sjaastad during a trip to the United States, Roque Fernández and Carlos Rodríguez, both with PhDs. from the University of Chicago were hired.

Joint Initiative for Latin American Experimental Economics 

The University of Chicago and UCEMA have concluded an agreement to jointly operate the Joint Initiative for Latin American Experimental Economics in the city of Buenos Aires. The Initiative is co-chaired by John List; Kenneth Griffin, Distinguished Service Professor of Economics at the Department of Economics at the University of Chicago; and Julio Elías, Director of the Master's in Economics at UCEMA. The main objective of the Initiative is to design field experiments to offer new perspectives in various areas of economic research for Latin American countries, such as education, private provision of public goods, social preferences, environmental economics. The Initiative is based at UCEMA, where it welcomes visiting researchers from the Experimental Economics group at the University of Chicago and invited researchers from other universities working on related issues in Latin America.

Buildings and sites 

UCEMA's two main buildings are in downtown Buenos Aires. The University is located in the heart of the country's economic and financial activity, a few meters from the intersection of Córdoba and Leandro N. Alem avenues.

 Headquarters:
Av. Córdoba 374, Ciudad de Buenos Aires

 Sede Reconquista:
Reconquista 775, Ciudad de Buenos Aires

 Sede Finanzas 
Av. Córdoba 637, Ciudad de Buenos Aires

The University has more than sixty offices for professors and researchers, more than thirty classrooms with a capacity for forty students, twelve quiet study rooms, rest and recreation rooms, a main hall, a multipurpose room, an auditorium, a computer center, of copying and bar.

Adrián Guissarri Library 

The UCEMA library was created concurrently with the Center for Macroeconomic Studies (CEMA) in 1978 at Calle Virrey del Pino 3210 and had a manual catalog that the user had to consult on-site. On October 30, 2007, the UCEMA Library was renamed the "Adrián Guissarri Library", in homage to the economist, Library user, and one of its greatest benefactors: he donated his personal library to the Institution.

The Adrián Guissarri Library updated its services over time and today its collection is made up of printed material, online databases, electronic books, etc. Currently, the Library is located at the UCEMA headquarters at Av. Córdoba 374.

Programs

Undergraduate 

Economics
Business Economics
Business Administration
Public Accountant
Marketing
Digital Business
Analytic Business
Finance
International Relations
Law
Political Science
Computing engineer

Graduate 

Ph.D. in Business Administration
Ph.D. in Finance
Ph.D. in Digital Business
Ph.D. in Economics
Master in Business Administration
Master in Economics
Master in Finances
Master in International Studies
Master in Agribusiness
Master in State science
Master in Project Evaluation
Postgraduate in Management
Postgraduate in Human Resources
Specialization in Finance
Specialization in Project Evaluation

Executive 
The university offers a lot of executives programs such as Sport Business, Change Management, Behavioral Economics, Customer Experience and many others.

Research and publications 

The institution has five of its own research centers: the Center for Applied Economics (CEA), the Center for the Economy of Creativity (CEC), the Center for Research in Management, Entrepreneurship and Investments (CIMEI), the Interdisciplinary Center for Politics, Business and Economics and the Organization and Productivity Studies (CEOP).

In each of them, tasks are undertaken that contribute to the development of science, technology and human culture. The research carried out at the CEMA University over the years is reflected in hundreds of working documents. They are among the 2% most consulted in the world according to REPEC (Research Papers in Economics), an entity that compiles access to virtual libraries on the Web. In addition, UCEMA has created and distributes the Journal of Applied Economics worldwide.1 It also publishes the journal Temas de Management and Revista UCEMA.

Currently, one of his research works highlighted and consulted by many media is the Executive Professional Basket (CPE). The CPE evaluates the cost of a representative consumption basket for the family group of an executive professional.

Student Life

Sport 

UCEMA actively participates in sports tournaments organized by the University Amateur Sports Association (ADAU). UCEMA teams participate in tennis, chess, football, and golf. Physical activity and sporting events take place during the weekends and training take place on weekdays in the evening hours. In addition to these, there are football practices organized by students from the university.

UCEMA Student Clubs 

Most academic areas have student societies of some form which are open to students studying all courses

The Levelers
Political Science Club that has an agenda of activities focused on conducting debates, visits to various national and international political and academic institutions, meetings with experts from the political and social fields, as well as intellectual production. Its members organize and engage in seminars and UN models, analyze the challenges facing political systems, and apply methods and forms of research and analysis.

Student's Consulting Club
It is a space for learning and co-creation between students interested in forming a profile with the characteristics of a consultant. It seeks to develop skills to solve complex business scenarios, as well as leadership and communication, keys to overcoming problems. Through the solution of practical cases, it trains how to carry out a comprehensive strategic analysis. This implies understanding the business model, identifying the root of the problem, and developing strategies to improve and enhance the current situation. In addition, it complements the content by giving talks with different leaders from the business world who tell about their experiences and the challenges they face on a daily basis.

Entrepreneurs Club
This initiative is promoted by undergraduate and postgraduate students to learn how to be better professionals and grow their projects.

Finance Club
It represents a meeting space for students and alumni, whether undergraduate and/or postgraduate, who are interested in finance. Segmented between those who wish to take their first steps and those who already work professionally in the sector, the Club offers a varied set of activities such as presentations, seminars, workshops, analysis of the situation, dissemination, and organization of stock market tournaments, networking meetings, among others. One of the fundamental pillars of the Club is based on financial education, since its main objective is to bring the world of finance closer to interested people, together with important learning tools. Likewise, for the professional segment and people with vast experience, the objective is to create a space for networking and updating relevant academic topics.

Computer Club
Its main objective is to generate a dynamic and open space for the community, where members can develop and strengthen different skills focused on technology and business.

Marketing Club
Created by and for UCEMA Marketing students with the aim of creating a networking space, a network of contacts where students help each other and promote joint growth, both professionally and personally. It organizes different activities such as meetings with graduates, excursions to companies and meetings on and off campus between students of all years of the degree.

International Community
It seeks to generate opportunities for cultural and academic exchange between foreign and local students, as well as to promote an international career development perspective in our community. It organizes informal activities such as outings and meetings, as well as talks aimed at creating an international community.

Debate Club
Space for interaction and learning that seeks to contribute to the comprehensive development of debate and public speaking skills to implement in different skills. Conduct activities outside of traditional debate to expand both the possibilities of the members and the reach of the club.

Law Club
Space designed for students where activities and exchange of concerns are carried out, in order to investigate the field of law and legal relations.

Economics Club
It provides a space in which knowledge in the field of economics is disseminated and shared, through talks, seminars and the publication of different articles.

Notable faculty and alumni 
 Jorge César Ávila, Ph.D. in Economics, University of Chicago. 
 Amado Boudou, former Vicepresident, head of the National Social Security Administration (ANSES) and Minister of Economy of the Argentine Republic.
 Andrés Cisneros, former Vice-Chancellor, Secretary of Foreign Affairs and Latin American Affairs and Minister of Foreign Affairs, International Trade and Worship of the Argentine Republic.
 Alejandro L. Corbacho, Ph.D. in Political Science, University of Connecticut. 
 Carlos Escudé, Argentine political scientist, researcher, writer and intellectual trained at Yale University, with previous studies at Oxford University, and at the Argentine Catholic University.
 José Luis Espert, National Congressman for the province of Buenos Aires. Former candidate for the presidency of the Argentine Republic.
 Roque Fernández, former President of the Central Bank, and Minister of Economy, Works and Public Services of the Argentine Republic.
 Marina Halac, professor of economics at Yale University. Winner of the Elaine Bennett Research Prize.
 Diana Mondino, Master in Economics and Business Management, IESE - Universidad de Navarra. 
 Sybil Rhodes, Ph.D. in Political Science, Stanford University. Director of the Department of Political Science and International Relations. President of the Center for the Opening and Development of Latin America (CADAL).
 Carlos A. Rodríguez, former Chief of the Cabinet of Advisors to the Minister of Economy and Secretary of Economic Policy.
 Juan Carlos de Pablo, Dr. honoris causa, UCEMA; Master of Arts in Economics, Harvard University; Degree in Economics, Pontifical Catholic University of Argentina.
 Alejandro Eduardo Fargosi, former Counselor of the National Judiciary.
 Martín Krause, Doctor in Administration, Universidad Católica de La Plata. Member of the Mont Pelerin Society, associate academician of the Cato Institute and of the Academic Council of the Fundación Libertad y Progreso.
 Ricardo Hipólito López Murphy, National Congressman for the City of Autonomous City of Buenos Aires. Former Minister of Defense, Minister of Economy and Minister of Infrastructure and Housing. Former candidate for the presidency of the Argentine Republic.
 Emilio Ocampo, Master of Business Administration, University of Chicago; Degree in Economics, UBA.
 Martin Uribe, Columbia University economics professor, editor-in-chief of the Journal of International Economics

References

UCEMA
Education in Buenos Aires
Business schools in Argentina
Educational institutions established in 1978
Universities in Buenos Aires Province